Tokers Bowl was an annual cannabis event held between 2002 and 2005 at British Columbia Marijuana Party Bookstore, in Vancouver. It was canceled in 2006 following a raid by the Vancouver Police. It was held in May or July and was described as "like a Cannabis Cup North".

See also
Cannabis in British Columbia
List of cannabis competitions

References

External links

2002 establishments in British Columbia
2006 disestablishments in British Columbia
Annual events in Canada
Cannabis events
Cannabis in British Columbia
Events in Vancouver
Recurring events established in 2002
Recurring events disestablished in 2006